The Woman God Sent is a 1920 American silent drama film directed by Laurence Trimble and starring Zena Keefe, Warren Cook and Joe King.

Cast
 Zena Keefe as 	Margaret Manning
 Warren Cook as 	Jack West Sr.
 Joe King as 	Jack West Jr.
 William Frederic as 	Senator Mathews 
 William Gudgeon as 	Pat Kane
 Louise Powell as 	Rosie
 William Magner as 	Joe
 Duncan Penwarden as Mason
 John P. Wade as Jim Connelly

References

Bibliography
 Connelly, Robert B. The Silents: Silent Feature Films, 1910-36, Volume 40, Issue 2. December Press, 1998.

External links
 

1920s American films
1920 films
1920 drama films
1920s English-language films
American silent feature films
Silent American drama films
American black-and-white films
Films directed by Laurence Trimble
Selznick Pictures films